The 2012–13 USHL season is the 34th season of the United States Hockey League as an all-junior league. The regular season began on September 28, 2012, and concluded on April 13, 2013, with the regular season champion winning the Anderson Cup.

The playoffs began on April 16, 2013, and completed on May 17, 2013.  The top four teams from each conference competed for the Clark Cup, with all series played in a best-of-five format.

This season was the 21st season in which one team captured both the Anderson Cup and the Clark Cup in the same season.  It was the first time the Dubuque Fighting Saints accomplished this feat.

Regular season
Final standings reflect games played through April 14, 2013

Note: GP = Games played; W = Wins; L = Losses; OTL = Overtime losses; PTS = Points; GF = Goals for; GA = Goals against; PIM = Penalties in minutesx = clinched playoff berth; y = clinched conference title; z = clinched regular season title

Eastern Conference

Western Conference

Players

Scoring leaders
Final statistics reflect games played through April 14, 2013

Note: GP = Games played; G = Goals; A = Assists; PTS = Points; +/- = Plus/Minus Rating; PIM = Penalties in minutes

Leading goaltenders
Final statistics reflect games played through April 14, 2013

Note: GP = Games played; MIN = Minutes played; W = Wins; L = Losses: OTL = Overtime losses; SL = Shootout losses; SO = Shutouts; GA = Goals Allowed; GAA = Goals against average; SV% = Save percentage

Clark Cup Playoffs

Conference semifinals
Note 1: All times are local.
Note 2: Game times in italics signify games to be played only if necessary.
Note 3: Home team is listed first.

Eastern Conference

(1) Dubuque Fighting Saints vs. (4) Muskegon Lumberjacks

(2) Green Bay Gamblers vs. (3) Youngstown Phantoms

Western Conference

(1) Sioux Falls Stampede vs. (4) Lincoln Stars

(2) Fargo Force vs. (3) Waterloo Black Hawks

Conference finals
Note 1: All times are local.
Note 2: Game times in italics signify games to be played only if necessary.
Note 3: Home team is listed first.

Eastern Conference

(1) Dubuque Fighting Saints vs. (3) Youngstown Phantoms

Western Conference

(1) Sioux Falls Stampede vs. (2) Fargo Force

Clark Cup Finals
Note 1: All times are local.
Note 2: Game times in italics signify games to be played only if necessary.
Note 3: Home team is listed first.

(E1) Dubuque Fighting Saints vs. (W2) Fargo Force

Playoff Statistics
Statistics reflect games played through May 17, 2013

Scoring leaders
Note: GP = Games played; G = Goals; A = Assists; PTS = Points; +/- = Plus/Minus Rating; PIM = Penalty minutes

Leading goaltenders
Note: GP = Games played; MIN = Minutes played; W = Wins; L = Losses; SO = Shutouts; GA = Goals Allowed; GAA = Goals against average; SV% = Save percentage

USHL Awards

All-USHL teams

First Team

Second Team

All-Rookie Team

References

External links
 Official website of the United States Hockey League

United States Hockey League seasons
Ushl